The Young Sinner is a 1960 West German drama film directed by Rudolf Jugert and starring Karin Baal, Vera Tschechowa and Rudolf Prack.

Cast
 Karin Baal as Eva Reck
 Vera Tschechowa as Carola
 Rudolf Prack as Werner Ortmann
 Grethe Weiser as Anna Reck
 Inge Egger as Marthe Ortmann
 Rainer Brandt as Robert
 Lore Hartling as Isa Sensbach
 Peter Thom as Ludwig Reck
 Peter Vogel as Erich Kolp
 Ruth Nimbach as Fräulein Werth
 Bum Krüger as Hehedorn
 Hans Richter as Müller
 Albert Bessler as Scharwitz
 Hellmut Grube
 Rola Käsmann
 Georg Lehn
 Lore Schulz
 Barbara Wiechmann
 Alwin Woesthoff
 Paul Hubschmid as Alfred Schott

References

Bibliography
 Hake, Sabine. German National Cinema. Routledge, 2013.

External links 
 

1960 films
1960 drama films
German drama films
West German films
1960s German-language films
Films directed by Rudolf Jugert
1960s German films